Prasanta Bhattacharya (born 17 August 1927) is an Indian former cricketer. He played two first-class matches for Bengal between 1958 and 1960.

See also
 List of Bengal cricketers

References

External links
 

1927 births
Living people
Indian cricketers
Bengal cricketers
Cricketers from Kolkata